Jatra is a 2016 Nepali-language Heist comedy film written and directed by Pradip Bhattarai. Produced by Rabindra Singh Baniya, Singe Lama and Yadav Poudel under banner of Shatkon Arts. It stars Bipin Karki, Rabindra Singh Baniya and Rabindra Jha in pivotal roles with supporting cast of Barsha Raut, Prakash Ghimire, Praween Khatiwada, Bholaraj Sapkota, Kamalmani Nepal, Sajan Thapa Magar, Nilkaji Shakya, Priyanka Jha, Susmita Karki, Prem Pandey and Safar Pokhrel.

Jatra is primarily shot in Asan Galli Kathmandu Valley, and it tells the story of three individuals who have many problems because of lack of money. The story revolves around the रु. 3 crore Nepalese rupees which was found by Phadindra Timilsina (Bipin Karki), The various ideas they implement to protect the money from its real owner and impact that occur in his and his friends life.

Jatra was released on 11 November 2016 in cinemas all over Nepal. It was a sleeper hit at the time of its release and emerged surprise hit at Nepalese Box Office. It also gained praise by the critics for its situational comedy and genuine acting by lead actors. The film had sequel Jatrai Jatra which was also commercially successful. The 2020 Hindi film Lootcase was heavily inspired by the core plot of this movie.

Synopsis 
Phadindra Timsina (Bipin Karki) is an innocent, poor and hardworking man. He finds a sack full of three crores Nepalese rupees, stolen from a bank. He then consults with his three friends Jayas (Rabindra Singh Baniya) and Munna (Rabindra Jha) in order to hijack money. The movie deals with all the strategies and hurdles planned and faced by the group of hijack planners in the course of hijacking the money. Poor and innocent Phadindra who is often blamed for his sincerity having been poor finally finds a way to prove his haters wrong. Now, will he be able to show them in real life? This is what the page looks like.

Cast
Bipin Karki as Phadindra Timsina/Pharen
Rabindra Singh Baniya as Joyesh
Rabindra Jha as Munna
Barsha Raut as Sampada; Pharen's wife
Prechya Bajracharya as a Pari
Prakash Ghimire SasuraBa
Praween Khatiwada
Kamalmani Nepal as Don
Bhola Raj Sapkota
Nilkaji Shakya
Sajan Thapa Magar
Priyanka Jha
Suresh Karki
Safar Pokharel

Soundtrack

References

2016 films
2010s Nepali-language films
Nepalese comedy films
Films shot in Kathmandu
2016 comedy films